Silva is a surname in Portuguese-speaking countries, such as Portugal and Brazil. It is derived from the Latin word , meaning "forest" or "woodland". It is the family name of the House of Silva.

The name is also widespread in Galician-speaking regions of Spain (mostly in Galicia) and even more so in regions of the former Portuguese Empire in the Americas (being the most common surname in Brazil), in Africa and Asia, notably in India and Sri Lanka. It is also quite common in Spanish-speaking Latin America.

Movement of people has led to the name being used in many places. Due to emigration from Portuguese-speaking countries, Silva (and the variants Da Silva and De Silva) is the fifth most common surname in the French department of Val-de-Marne, outside Paris, and it was the 19th most common family name given to newborns between 1966 and 1990 in France. It is also the seventh most common surname (and the most common non-German, non-French) in Luxembourg. It is also among the top 20 surnames in Andorra, Angola, Cape Verde and Switzerland.

Geographical distribution
As of 2014, 64.7% of all known bearers of the surname Silva were residents of Brazil (frequency 1:57), 5.3% of Mexico (1:417), 5.1% of Portugal (1:37), 3.2% of Mozambique (1:152), 2.8% of Venezuela (1:192), 2.7% of the United States (1:2,361), 2.3% of Chile (1:136), 2.2% of Argentina (1:349), 2.2% of Peru (1:263), 2.0% of Colombia (1:424) and 1.1% of Guinea-Bissau (1:29).

In Brazil, the frequency of the surname was higher than national average (1:57) in the following states:
 Maranhão (1:24)
 Bahia (1:32)
 Roraima (1:32)
 Pará (1:35)
 Acre (1:38)
 Amapá (1:39)
 Alagoas (1:39)
 Sergipe (1:40)
 Amazonas (1:43)
 Rio Grande do Norte (1:47)
 Pernambuco (1:51)
 Goiás (1:53)
 Paraíba (1:53)
 Piauí (1:54)
 Ceará (1:55)
 Federal District (1:55)

Arts

Actors
Adele Silva, British actress
António Silva (actor) (1886–1971), Portuguese actor
Deepani Silva, Sri Lankan actress
Douglas Silva, Brazilian actor
Fernando Ramos da Silva (1967–1987), Brazilian actor
Frank Silva (1950–1995), American actor and set dresser
Freddie Silva (1938–2001), Sri Lankan actor, comedian and playback singer
Gertrudes Rita da Silva (1825–1888), Portuguese actor
Henry Silva (1926–2022), American actor
Howard da Silva, American actor and director
Sadiris Master (died 1958), Sri Lankan Sinhalese actor, musician
Hilarion "Larry" Silva (1937–2004), Filipino actor, comedian and politician
Leena de Silva (born 1936), Sri Lankan Sinhala film, television, and theater actress
Leslie Silva, American actress
Nicole da Silva, Australian actress
Palitha Silva, Sri Lankan actor
Paulo Rogério da Silva, Brazilian actor also known as Gero Camilo
Roy de Silva (1937–2018), Sri Lankan Sinhalese actor and film director
Sanjit De Silva, Sri Lankan American actor and director
Simone Silva (1928–1957), Egyptian-born French film actress, also briefly in British films

Musicians
Da Silva (singer), French singer, songwriter of Portuguese origin
Alan Silva, American free jazz double bassist
Amancio D'Silva (1936–1996), Indian jazz guitarist and composer
Andrew Conrad De Silva, Sri Lankan Australian R&B and rock vocalist and instrumentalist
Dawn Silva, American funk vocalist
Deepal Silva, Sri Lankan Sinhalese playback singer and actor
Desmond de Silva, Sri Lankan vocalist
Francisco Manuel da Silva (1795–1865), Brazilian composer and music professor
Henry Silva, Cape Verdean band leader/singer
Humberto Rodríguez Silva (1908–1952), Cuban composer and judge
Horace Silver (1928–2014), American jazz pianist, composer and bandleader
Luis Silva (1943–2008), American Tejano songwriter
Lúcio Silva da Souza, known artistically as Silva, Brazilian singer-songwriter and multi-instrumentalist
Malcolm "Mac" Silva (1947–1989), Aboriginal Australian musician, who appeared in the film Country Outcasts
Rui da Silva, Portuguese DJ
Stuart de Silva, Sri Lankan Australian jazz pianist
Virajini Lalithya de Silva, Sri Lankan Sinhalese vocalist
Vivian Wilson da Silva Fernandes, Indian Rapper from Mumbai, India, also known as DIVINE
Vivienne de Silva Boralessa (1930–2017), Sri Lankan vocalist (Buddhist devotional music)
Yohani Diloka de Silva, Sri Lankan singer, songwriter, rapper, music producer, YouTuber and businesswoman, also known as Yohani

Painters and sculptors
António Carvalho de Silva Porto, Portuguese naturalist painter
Diego Rodríguez de Silva y Velázquez (Diego Velázquez), Spanish painter
Francis Augustus Silva, American painter
Manuel Pereira da Silva, Portuguese sculptor
Marilyn da Silva, American metalsmith
Maria Helena Vieira da Silva, Portuguese painter
William Posey Silva, American painter

Writers
First name
Silva Kaputikyan, Armenian poet, writer, academician and public activist

Surname
Alfreda de Silva (1920–2001), Sri Lankan Sinhala poet, journalist, and screenwriter
António Diniz da Cruz e Silva, Portuguese heroic-comic poet
António José da Silva, eighteenth-century Brazilian Converso playwright known as "The Jew"
Arménio Adroaldo Vieira e Silva (Arménio Vieira), Portuguese journalist
Baltasar Lopes da Silva, Cape Verdean writer
Daniel Silva (novelist), American author
John de Silva, Sri Lankan Sinhalese playwright
José Gabriel Lopes da Silva (Gabriel Mariano), Cape Verdean poet and essayist
Joseph Silva, a pseudonym of American author Ron Goulart
Luís Filipe Silva, Portuguese writer
Nihal De Silva, Sri Lankan Sinhalese novelist
Sugathapala de Silva, Sri Lankan Sinhalese dramatist, novelist, radio play producer, and translator
Wellawattearachchige Abraham Silva, Sri Lankan Sinhalese novelist
Wilson da Silva, Australian/Portuguese science writer, editor and filmmaker

Other arts
Ena de Silva, re-established Sri Lanka's batik industry
 Ingrid Silva, Brazilian ballet dancer
Maria José Marques da Silva, Portuguese architect
Minnette de Silva, Sri Lankan Sinhalese architect

Historical figures
Bernardo Peres da Silva, the first and only native Goan governor of Portuguese India
Lucius Flavius Silva, Roman governor of Judea who crushed Jewish resistance at Masada in 73 AD
José Joaquim da Silva Xavier (1746–1792), known as Tiradentes, Brazilian independence leader
Pedro da Silva, first post courier of Canada (17th–18th century)
Ruy Gómez de Silva (1516–1573), nobleman and cousin of Philip II of Spain

Media
Dayananda de Silva, Sri Lankan Sinhalese radio journalist at Radio Ceylon
João Silva (photographer), South African photographer
Martin Silva, Portuguese-Canadian politician and radio personality
Sampath Lakmal de Silva, Sri Lankan Sinhalese journalist specializing in defense issues
Tatiana Silva Braga Tavares, Belgian model, Miss Belgium 2005
Tom Silva, general contractor on the PBS show This Old House

Thotawatte Don Manuel Titus de Silva, popularly as Titus Thotawatte, Sri Lankan director and editor

Political and military figures

Alexander Edmund de Silva Wijegooneratne Samaraweera Rajapakse (1866–1937), Sri Lankan Sinhala politician
Amaro Silva, municipal politician in Winnipeg (Manitoba), Canada
Aníbal Cavaco Silva, President of Portugal
Anthony Emmanuel Silva, Sri Lankan Tamil Member of Parliament
António Maria da Silva, Portuguese politician
Artur da Costa e Silva, Brazilian military officer and politician
Asoka de Silva, 9th Commander of the Sri Lanka Navy
Asoka de Silva, 42nd Chief Justice of Sri Lanka
Benedita da Silva, Brazilian politician
Charles Percival de Silva, Sri Lankan Sinhalese politician
Charles de Silva Batuwantudawe (1877–1940), Sri Lankan Sinhala lawyer and politician
Chitta Ranjan De Silva, Sri Lankan Sinhalese lawyer, Chairman of the Lessons Learnt and Reconciliation Commission, 40th Attorney General of Sri Lanka, 39th Solicitor General of Sri Lanka
Colvin Reginald de Silva, Sri Lankan Sinhalese Trotskyist Member of Parliament, Cabinet Minister of Plantation Industries and Constitutional Affairs
Crishantha de Silva, 21st Commander of the Sri Lanka Army
Desmond Lorenz de Silva, Sri Lankan Briton lawyer, former United Nations Chief War Crimes Prosecutor in Sierra Leone
D. G. Albert de Silva, Sri Lankan Sinhalese Member of Parliament
Duleep de Silva Wickramanayake, Sri Lankan Sinhala army major-general
Duminda Silva, Sri Lankan politician
Estanislau da Silva, East Timorese politician and member of the Revolutionary Front for an Independent East Timor
Eunice Silva, Cape Verdean civil engineer and politician
Francisco de Paula Vieira da Silva de Tovar, 1st Viscount of Molelos, Portuguese politician
Frank de Silva (born 1935), Inspector-General of Sri Lanka Police from 1993–1995
Fredrick de Silva, Sri Lankan Sinhalese lawyer and politician
Gardiye Punchihewage Amaraseela Silva, 34th Chief Justice of Sri Lanka
George E. de Silva, Sri Lankan Sinhalese lawyer and politician
G.E.S. de Silva, Commanding Officer of the Sri Lanka Volunteer Naval Force
G. H. De Silva, 13th Commander of the Sri Lanka Army
Golbery do Couto e Silva, Brazilian politician
G. P. S. de Silva, 40th Chief Justice of Sri Lanka
George Reginald de Silva, Sri Lankan Sinhalese politician
Gratian Silva (1933–2015), Sri Lankan Sinhala army major general
H. A. Silva, 11th Commander of the Sri Lanka Navy
Hélio José da Silva Lima (born 1960), Brazilian politician known as Hélio José
Herman Leonard de Silva, Sri Lankan Sinhalese lawyer and diplomat, 12th Permanent Representative of Sri Lanka to the United Nations in New York
Israel Pinheiro da Silva, Brazilian politician and engineer
Jaime Silva, former Minister of Agriculture, Rural Development and Fisheries of Portugal
Jayatilleke De Silva (1938–2019), Sri Lankan Sinhala Communist guerrilla 
Jim Silva, American politician
José Albino Silva Peneda, Portuguese politician
José Bonifácio de Andrada e Silva, Brazilian activist
K. L. A. Ranasinghe Silva, 41st Surveyor General of Sri Lanka
Leopold James de Silva Seneviratne, Sri Lankan Sinhala civil servant
Lucien Macull Dominic de Silva (1893–1962), Sri Lankan Sinhala member of the Privy Council
Luís Alves de Lima e Silva, Duke of Caxias, Brazilian military commander
Luís da Silva Mouzinho de Albuquerque, Portuguese politician
Luis Roberto da Sliva (born 1977), East Timorese politician
Luiz Inácio Lula da Silva, current President of Brazil
Lydia Méndez Silva, Puerto Rican politician affiliated with the Popular Democratic Party
Makalandage Johnny Terrence De Silva Gunawardena, 8th Commander of the Sri Lanka Air Force
Manikku Wadumestri Hendrick de Silva, 26th Attorney General of Sri Lanka
Manuel António Vassalo e Silva, Portuguese politician
Manuel Carvalho da Silva, coordinator of the Portuguese Labour union federation
Marina Silva, Brazilian environmentalist and politician
Mario Silva, Canadian politician
Osmund de Silva, 13th Inspector General of the Sri Lanka Police
Pandikoralalage Sunil Chandra De Silva, 35th Attorney General of Sri Lanka
Patrick de Silva Kularatna, Sri Lankan Sinhalese politician and educationist
Pettagan Dedreck Weerasingha de Silva, Sri Lankan Sinhalese Member of Parliament 
Mervin Rex de Silva, Sri Lankan Sinhalese fighter pilot who served in the Royal Air Force during World War II
Mervyn Silva, Sri Lankan Sinhalese politician
Mohan Priyadarshana De Silva, Sri Lankan Sinhalese Member of Parliament for Galle Electoral District
Nilenthi Nimal Siripala de Silva, Sri Lankan Sinhalese politician, Sri Lankan Minister of Transport
Peduru Hewage William de Silva, Sri Lankan Sinhalese Trotskyist politician, Cabinet Minister of Industries and Fisheries 1956–1959
Piyal De Silva, Commander of the Sri Lanka Navy
Piyal Nishantha de Silva (born 1970), Sri Lankan Sinhala Cabinet Minister
Prasanna de Silva (born 1961), Sri Lankan Sinhala Army major-general
Ranjith de Silva, Sri Lanka Light Infantry major-general
Rupika De Silva, Sri Lankan Sinhala women's rights and peace activist
Sampathawaduge Stephen Anthony Silva, Sri Lankan Sinhalese Member of Parliament
Sarath N. Silva, 41st Chief Justice of Sri Lanka
Shan Wijayalal De Silva, 5th Chief Minister of Southern Province, Sri Lanka
Sharon Quirk-Silva (born 1962), American politician
Shavendra Silva, Sri Lankan Sinhalese general and diplomat
Sonia Silva, American politician
Stephen de Silva Jayasinghe (1911–1977), Sri Lankan Sinhala politician
Thakur Artha Niranjan Joseph De Silva Deva Aditya (born 1948), Sri Lankan Briton politician
T. N. De Silva, former Commandant of the Sri Lanka Army Volunteer Force
Vincent Stuart de Silva Wikramanayake (1876–1953), Sri Lankan Sinhala lawyer and politician
Wilmot Arthur de Silva, Sri Lankan Sinhalese politician, veterinary surgeon, and philanthropist, Minister of Health in the second State Council of Ceylon
Walwin Arnold de Silva, Sri Lankan Sinhalese civil servant

Religion
Saint Beatrice of Silva, Portuguese Dominican nun
Clarence Richard Silva, United States Catholic bishop
Hezekiah da Silva, Jewish author born in Livorno, Italy, and teacher in Jerusalem
Blessed João Mendes de Silva (Amadeus of Portugal), Portuguese Hieronymite and later Franciscan
Kanishka de Silva Raffel (born 1964), Sri Lankan Australian Anglican priest, 12th Dean of St Andrew's Cathedral, Sydney
Lynn de Silva, Sri Lankan Methodist theologian
Maxwell Silva, Sri Lankan Sinhala Catholic priest, Auxiliary Bishop of the Archdiocese of Colombo
Raúl Silva Henríquez, Chilean cardinal of the Roman Catholic Church
Robert D'Silva, Pakistani Catholic priest

Scholars
Agostinho da Silva, Portuguese philosopher
Arjuna Priyadarsin de Silva, Sri Lankan Sinhalese gastroenterologist
Chandra Richard de Silva, Sri Lankan Sinhalese academic, historian, and author
Clarence de Silva, Canadian engineer
Dudley Kenneth George de Silva, Sri Lankan Sinhalese educationist
Harendra de Silva, Sri Lankan Sinhalese pediatrician
H. Janaka de Silva, Sri Lankan Sinhalese physician
Jayathi De Silva, Sri Lankan scientist and model
José Sebastião e Silva, Portuguese mathematician
Kingsley De Silva, Sri Lankan obstetrician and gynaecologist
Kingsley Muthumuni de Silva, Sri Lankan Sinhalese academic, historian, and author
Kongahage Anslem Lawrence de Silva (born 1940), Sri Lankan Sinhala biologist and herpetologist
Maria Nazareth F. da Silva, Brazilian zoologist
Maurício Rocha e Silva, Brazilian physician
Mohan De Silva, Sri Lankan Sinhalese surgeon
Moisés Silva, Cuban-born American professor of biblical studies
Primus Thilakaratne de Silva, Sri Lankan Sinhalese senior consultant physician
Ranjith Premalal De Silva, Sri Lankan Sinhalese professor of agricultural engineering
Sammu Raghu De Silva Chandrakeerthy, Sri Lankan Sinhalese engineering professor
Vajiranath Lakshman De Silva, Sri Lankan Sinhalese doctor, founder of the Saukyadana Movement
Alcino J. Silva, Portugal-born American neuroscientist

Sports
Many people on this list are not generally known as Silva.

Auto racing
Ayrton Senna da Silva, also known as Ayrton Senna or Senna, Brazilian Formula One triple world champion
Ollie Silva, American auto racing driver

Basketball
 Chris Silva (Chris Silva Obame Correia), Gabonese player
 Filipe da Silva, Portuguese player
 Maria Paula Silva, Brazilian player
 Oscar da Silva (born 1998), German basketball player
 Paulo César da Silva or Giant Silva (born 1962), Brazilian national player, later wrestler and mixed martial artist

Beach volleyball
Jackie Silva, Brazilian beach volleyball player
Paulo Emilio Silva, Brazilian beach volleyball player

Cricket
Alankara Asanka Silva, Sri Lankan Sinhalese cricketer
Amal Silva, Sri Lankan Sinhalese cricketer
Amila Silva, Sri Lankan Sinhalese cricketer
Aravinda De Silva, Sri Lankan international cricketer
Aruna de Silva, Sri Lankan Sinhalese first-class cricketer
Ashen Silva, Sri Lankan Sinhalese first-class cricketer
Ashley de Silva, Sri Lankan international cricketer
Asiri de Silva, Sri Lankan Sinhalese cricketer
Asoka de Silva, Sri Lankan international cricketer
Bertie de Silva, Sri Lankan Sinhalese cricketer who played for the University of Oxford
Chalana de Silva, Sri Lankan Sinhalese cricketer
Chamara Silva, Sri Lankan international cricketer
Chamod Silva, Sri Lankan Sinhalese cricketer
Chirantha de Silva, Sri Lankan Sinhalese cricketer
Damitha Silva, Sri Lankan Sinhalese cricketer
Dandeniya Premachandra de Silva, Sri Lankan Sinhalese cricketer
Dandeniyage Somachandra de Silva, Sri Lankan Sinhalese international cricketer
Dedunu Silva, Sri Lankan Sinhalese cricketer
Denagamage Praboth Mahela de Silva Jayawardena, Sri Lankan Sinhalese cricketer
Deva Lokesh Stanley de Silva, Sri Lankan Sinhalese ODI cricketer
Dhananjaya Maduranga de Silva, Sri Lankan Sinhalese cricketer
Elle Hennadige Shadeep Nadeeja Silva, Sri Lankan Sinhalese cricketer who played for United Arab Emirates
Emmanuel Nadhula de Silva Wijeratne, Sri Lankan Sinhalese cricketer
Ganga de Silva, Sri Lankan Sinhalese woman cricketer
Gayashan Ranga de Silva Munasinghe, Sri Lankan Italian cricketer
Gihan De Silva, Sri Lankan Sinhalese cricketer
Ginigalgodage Ramba Ajit de Silva, Sri Lankan Sinhalese cricketer
Granville Nissanka de Silva, Sri Lankan Sinhalese cricketer
Hanthana Dewage Rashmi Sewandi Silva (born 2000), Sri Lankan Sinhala cricketer for Sri Lanka Navy Sports Club
Hasitha Lakmal de Silva, Sri Lankan Sinhalese cricketer
Hendahewage Sanjeewa Gayan Sameera Silva, Sri Lankan Sinhalese cricketer for the United Arab Emirates
Janith Silva, Sri Lankan Sinhalese cricketer
Jayan Kaushal Silva, Sri Lankan Sinhalese test cricketer
Joshua Da Silva, Trinidadian cricketer, test match wicket keeper/batsman for the West Indies cricket team
Kariyawasam Thantrige Gayan Thilanka de Silva, Sri Lankan Sinhalese Bahraini cricketer
Karunakalage Sajeewa Chanaka de Silva, Sri Lankan Sinhalese cricketer  
Kasun de Silva, Sri Lankan Sinhalese cricketer
Kelaniyage Jayantha Silva, Sri Lankan Sinhalese cricketer
Lanka de Silva, Sri Lankan Sinhalese international cricketer
Liyana de Silva, Sri Lankan Sinhalese cricketer
Malinga de Silva, Sri Lankan Sinhalese cricketer
Mangamuni Gamini Silva, Sri Lankan Sinhalese first-class cricketer
Manelker De Silva, Sri Lankan Sinhalese cricketer
Milroy Silva, Sri Lankan Sinhalese cricketer
Muthumuni Raween Lakshitha de Silva, Sri Lankan Sinhalese cricketer
Nilakshi de Silva, Sri Lankan Sinhalese cricketer
Nilan De Silva, Sri Lankan Sinhalese cricketer
Patiharamada Juwan Hewage Sanath Ranjan Silva, Sri Lankan Sinhalese cricketer
Pinnaduwage Chaturanga de Silva, Sri Lankan Sinhalese cricketer
Pinnaduwage Wanindu Hasaranga De Silva, Sri Lankan Sinhalese cricketer
Pradeep de Silva, Sri Lankan Sinhalese cricketer
Ramindu de Silva, Sri Lankan Sinhalese cricketer
Richard Martin M. de Silva, Sri Lankan Sinhalese cricketer
Rodrigo Hennedige Sanjeewa Silva, Sri Lankan Sinhalese cricketer
Roshan Silva, Sri Lankan Sinhalese cricketer
Roshen Silva, Sri Lankan Sinhalese test cricketer
Roy Silva, Sri Lankan Sinhalese cricketer
Rumesh Silva, Sri Lankan Sinhalese cricketer
Sammu Nirwantha Thikshila de Silva, Sri Lankan Sinhalese cricketer
Sampathwaduge Amal Rohitha Silva, Sri Lankan Sinhalese international cricketer
Sanath de Silva, Sri Lankan Sinhalese cricketer
Senal de Silva, Sri Lankan Sinhalese cricketer
Shaluka Silva, Sri Lankan Sinhalese cricketer
Sripal Silva, Sri Lankan Sinhalese cricketer
T. Silva, Sri Lankan Sinhalese cricketer
Warshamannada Pradeep de Silva, Sri Lankan Sinhalese cricketer
Weddikkara Ruwan Sujeewa de Silva, Sri Lankan Sinhalese test cricketer
Woshantha Silva, Sri Lankan Sinhalese cricketer
Yakupiti Gayan Asanka de Silva, Sri Lankan Sinhalese cricketer
Yohan de Silva, Sri Lankan Sinhalese first-class cricketer

Football

Brazil
Male international players
Afonso Guimarães da Silva, Afonsinho
Alexandre da Silva Mariano
Alexandre Rodrigues da Silva, Alexandre Pato
Cleonésio Carlos da Silva
Dani Alves, Daniel Alves da Silva
Gilberto Silva
Gilberto da Silva Melo
Giovanni Silva de Oliveira
Heurelho da Silva Gomes, Heurelho Gomes
Jackson Coelho Silva
João Alves de Assis Silva, Jô
Jorge Luís Andrade da Silva
José Roberto da Silva Júnior, Zé Roberto
Leônidas da Silva
Lucimar Ferreira da Silva, Lúcio
Luiz Alberto da Silva Oliveira
Mauro Silva, Mauro da Silva Gomes
Nélson de Jesus Silva, Dida (footballer born 1973)
Neymar, Neymar da Silva Santos Júnior
Nilmar Honorato da Silva, Nilmar
Oscarino Costa Silva
Roberto Carlos da Silva Rocha, Roberto Carlos
Sean de Silva
Thiago Emiliano da Silva, Thiago Silva
Willian, Willian Borges da Silva

Female international players
Cristiane Rozeira de Souza Silva
Kátia, Kátia Cilene Teixeira da Silva
Marta (footballer), Marta Vieira da Silva
Thaís Helena da Silva

Others
Adaílton da Silva Santos
Adriano Pereira da Silva
Aílton Gonçalves da Silva
Airton Ferreira da Silva (Airton Pavilhão)
Alan Osório da Costa Silva
Ana Paula Pereira da Silva Villela
André Luiz Silva do Nascimento
Antônio da Silva (footballer)
David da Silva
Deivson Rogério da Silva (Bobô (footballer, born 1985))
Diego da Silva Costa
Elisérgio da Silva (Serginho Baiano)
Elpídio Silva
Fábio da Silva Alves
Fábio do Nascimento Silva
Fábio Ferreira da Silva
Fábio Pereira da Silva
Hugo Veloso Oliveira Silva
Jefferson Teixeira Silva (Jefferson Luis)
Johnathan Aparecido da Silva
José Fábio da Silva
Josualdo Alves da Silva Oliveira
Lauro Antonio Ferreira da Silva
Lucenilde Pereira da Silva
Luciano José Pereira da Silva
Luís Cláudio Carvalho da Silva
Manoel de Oliveira da Silva Júnior
Márcio Pereira da Silva
Marcos Roberto da Silva Barbosa
Marcus Lima Silva
Michael Anderson Pereira da Silva
Otacilio Jales da Silva
Paulo Sérgio Oliveira da Silva
Rafael Pereira da Silva, footballer, born 1980
Rafael Pereira da Silva, footballer, born 1990
Renan Teixeira da Silva
Sérgio Severino da Silva
Tiago Silva dos Santos
Ueslei Raimundo Pereira da Silva
Vitor Silva Assis de Oliveira Júnior (Vitor Júnior)
Víctor Domingo Silva
Wender Coelho da Silva (Teco (footballer))
Wéverton Pereira da Silva
William da Silva Barbosa

Croatia
Eduardo da Silva

England
Jay Dasilva

Equatorial Guinea
Emmanuel Danilo Clementino Silva (Danilo Clementino)

Paraguay
Anthony Domingo Silva
Paulo da Silva

Portugal
Adrien Silva
André Miguel Valente da Silva (André Silva)
Anthony da Silva
António Conceição da Silva Oliveira
Bernardo Silva, Bernardo Mota Veiga de Carvalho e Silva
Carlos da Silva
Jose Bosingwa Da Silva
Daniel da Silva Soares
David Mendes da Silva
Edson Rolando Silva Sousa
Eusébio da Silva Ferreira
José Carlos da Silva José
José Manuel da Silva Fernandes (Zé Manel (footballer))
João Nuno da Silva Cardoso Lucas (João Lucas)
João Paulo da Silva Gouveia Morais
José Paulo Sousa da Silva
João Pedro da Silva Pereira (João Pereira (Portuguese footballer))
Lourenço da Silva (Luís Lourenço)
Marco Silva, Marco Alexandre Saraiva da Silva
Mário Silva (footballer)
Paulo da Silva (Paulo César da Silva Barrios)
Paulo Monteiro (Paulo Armando da Silva Monteiro)
Ricardo Emídio Ramalho Silva

Spain
David Silva, David Josué Jiménez Silva
Donato Gama da Silva
Fernando Macedo da Silva

Sri Lanka
Anton Silva
Dillon De Silva (born 2002), Sinhala footballer

Uruguay
Bruno Silva
Darío Silva
Martín Silva
Néstor Silva
Pablo Silva
Santiago Silva

Managers and referees
Carlos Silva Valente, Portuguese football referee
Fred Silva, United States American-football official
Telê Santana da Silva, Brazilian football manager
Vanderlei Luxemburgo da Silva, Brazilian football coach

Martial arts
Anderson Silva, Brazilian mixed martial artist
Antônio Silva, Brazilian mixed martial artist
Assuerio Silva, Brazilian mixed martial artist
Edinanci Silva, Brazilian judoka
Erick Silva, Brazilian mixed martial artist
Giant Silva (Paulo César da Silva), Brazilian mixed martial artist
Jay Silva, Brazilian mixed martial artist
Jussier da Silva, Brazilian mixed martial artist
Natália Falavigna da Silva, Brazilian taekwondo athlete
Thiago Silva (fighter), Brazilian mixed martial artist
Wanderlei Silva, Brazilian mixed martial artist

Track and field
Adhemar da Silva, Brazilian athlete
Anísio Silva, Brazilian triple jumper
Carlos Silva (hurdler) (born 1974), Portuguese hurdler
Fábio Gomes da Silva, pole vaulter
Fátima Silva, Portuguese long-distance runner
Germán Silva, Mexican long distance runner
Jani Chathurangani Chandra Silva Hondamuni, Sri Lankan Sinhalese sprinter
Joaquim Silva (athlete), Portuguese long-distance runner
Joseildo da Silva, Brazilian long-distance runner
Osmiro Silva, Brazilian long-distance runner
Pedro da Silva (athlete), Brazilian decathlete
Robson da Silva, Brazilian sprinter
Rui Silva (athlete), Portuguese Olympic athlete
Vânia Silva, Portuguese hammer thrower

Other sports
Carlos Silva (baseball), Venezuelan baseball player
Chandrika de Silva, Sri Lankan badminton player
Cherantha de Silva, Sri Lankan Sinhalese swimmer
Daniel Silva (golfer), Portuguese golfer
Eden Giselle Silva, Sri Lankan Briton tennis player
Emanuel Silva, Portuguese flatwater canoeist
Eurico Rosa da Silva, Brazilian-born Canadian jockey
Fabiola da Silva, Brazilian inline skater
Frederico Ferreira Silva, Portuguese tennis player
Garth da Silva, New Zealand boxer
Inoka Rohini de Silva, Sri Lankan badminton player
Jamie Silva, American football safety
Jason Silva, American rock climber
John da Silva, New Zealand wrestler and boxer
Luís Mena e Silva, Portuguese horse rider
Neuza Silva, Portuguese tennis player
Raquel Silva, Brazilian volleyball player
Roberto Silva Nazzari, Uruguayan chess master
Rogério Dutra Silva, Brazilian tennis player

Other professions
A. E. de Silva, Sri Lankan Sinhalese businessman
Eugenia Silva, Spanish model
Sir Ernest de Silva, Sri Lankan Sinhalese business magnate, banker, and barrister
George David Silva, Sri Lankan Sinhalese Australian mass murderer
João Marques Silva, Portuguese researcher
José da Silva Pais, Portuguese soldier
José Silva (parapsychologist), Portuguese-American parapsychologist
Kamaj Silva (born 1983), Sri Lankan Sinhala entrepreneur 
Moises Teixeira da Silva, Brazilian robber
Palmira Silva, British murder victim
Riccardo Silva (born 1970), Italian businessman
Quentin D'Silva, Pakistani businessman
Steven Silva, American chef
Thakurartha Devadithya Guardiyawasam Lindamulage Nalin Kumara de Silva, Sri Lankan Sinhalese promoter of pseudoscience
Jean Charles da Silva e de Menezes, known as Jean Charles de Menezes, Brazilian man killed by British police in 2005

Fictional characters 
Silva (Shaman King), in Shaman King
Silva, a mystical speaking necklace in GARO
Raoul Silva, the antagonist of the James Bond film Skyfall
Rose Da Silva, Christopher Da Silva and Sharon Da Silva, fictional characters in the film Silent Hill
Kristen De Silva, protagonist in Child's Play 3, played by Perrey Reeves
Noelle Silva, a character in Black Clover
 Octavio Silva, a playable character known as Octane in Apex Legends

See also

Name disambiguation page
Alexandre da Silva (disambiguation)
Daniel Silva (disambiguation)
Fábio Silva (disambiguation)
Tomás Silva (disambiguation)
Washington Silva (disambiguation)

More specific surname disambiguation page
Alves da Silva
Pereira da Silva
Silva Oliveira and Oliveira Silva

References

Bibliography
 BOUZA ZERRANO, José. Da Descendência de Don Francisco Prieto Gayoso'. Edição do Autor, 1ª Edição, Lisboa, 1980.
 COROMINES, Joan. Onomasticon Cataloniæ (vol. I-VIII). Barcelona: 1994.
 SOUSA, Manuel de. As origens dos apelidos das famílias portuguesas. Sporpress, 2001.
 TÁVORA, D. Luis de Lancastre e. Dicionário das Famílias Portuguesas''. Quetzal Editores, 2ª Edição, Lisboa, pág. 324.

Surnames of Uruguayan origin
Portuguese-language surnames
Galician-language surnames
Italian-language surnames
Sinhalese surnames
Surnames of Sri Lankan origin